was a feudal domain under the Tokugawa shogunate of Edo period Japan, located in Tōtōmi Province. It was centered at Yokosuka Castle in what is now the Matsuo district of the city of Kakegawa in Shizuoka Prefecture.

History
In February 1601, Ōsuga Tadamasa, lord of Kururi Domain in Kazusa Province, was allowed by Tokugawa Ieyasu to return to his ancestral estates in Tōtōmi, and was granted the status of a 55,000 koku daimyō. Ōsuga Tadamasa was the son of the Castellan of Yokosuka Castle and had been relocated by Toyotomi Hideyoshi along with Ieyasu to the Kantō region. During the unsettled period following Hideyoshi’s death, Ōsuga Tadamasa developed a reputation for his upright leadership, and was a strong supporter of Ieyasu. However, his son succeeded to Tatebayashi Domain (110,000 koku) in Kōzuke Province, and Yokosuka Domain reverted to tenryō status in December 1615.

In October 1619, Matsudaira Shigekatsu was transferred from Sekiyado Domain in Shimōsa Province and assigned revenues of 26,000 koku at Yokosuka. His son, Matsudaira Shigetada, former castellan of Sumpu Castle became daimyō in 1621, and had his revenues increased to 40,000 koku before being transferred to Kaminoyama Domain in Dewa Province the following year.

Yokosuka Domain was assigned next to rōjū Inoue Masanari, with revenues now set at 52,500 koku. His son, Inoue Masatoshi inherited only 47,500 koku in 1628, with the remaining 5,000 koku assigned to his younger brother. However, he was rewarded with 2,500 koku by Shōgun Tokugawa Iemitsu for his role in the Tokugawa Tadanaga affair, and was thus ranked as 50,000 koku daimyō when he was transferred to Kasama Domain in Hitachi Province in 1645.

The next inhabitant of Yokosuka Castle was Honda Toshinaga, formerly daimyō of Okazaki Domain in Owari Province. Honda proved to be a very unpopular ruler, spending prolifically on prostitutes and sake, ignoring matters of governance, imprisoning or executing his advisors and establishing a network of spies and informers throughout the domain. After severely increasing taxes and issuing a series of 100 repressive ordinances in 1682, the domain was struck by a typhoon, after which the population rose in revolt. Honda was arrested by officials from the Tokugawa Shogunate and imprisoned within Edo Castle, where he was charged with 23 charges of official misconduct. However, he was later pardoned, and assigned to Murayama Domain in Dewa Province (10,000 koku).

Following this incident, Yokosuka Domain was assigned to Nishio Tadanari, formerly of Komoro Domain, Shinano Province, whose family ruled for the next eight generations until the Meiji Restoration.

The domain had a population of 2,644 people per the Kyōhō period (1716-1735) census, which decreased to 2525 people per the Keiō period (1865-1867) census. The domain maintained its primary residence (kamiyashiki) in Edo at Soto-Sakura, in what is now Kasumigaseki, Tokyo.

During the Bakumatsu period, the eighth (and final) daimyō, Nishio Tadaatsu, initially attempted to remain neutral, but later contributed his forces to the imperial armies. In February 1869, he was transferred by the new Meiji government to the short-lived Hanabusa Domain in Awa Province and Yokosuka Domain was absorbed into the new Shizuoka Domain created for retired ex-Shōgun Tokugawa Yoshinobu. .

Holdings at the end of the Edo period
As with most domains in the han system, Yokosuka Domain consisted of several discontinuous territories calculated to provide the assigned kokudaka, based on periodic cadastral surveys and projected agricultural yields.

Tōtōmi Province
66 villages in Kitō District
9 villages in Saya District
6 villages in Shūchi District
17 villages in Yamane District
Suruga Province
13 villages in Shida District

List of daimyō 
{| class=wikitable
! #||Name || Tenure || Courtesy title || Court Rank || kokudaka
|-
|colspan=6| Ōsuga clan, 1601-1619 (fudai)
|-
||1||||1601–1607||Dewa-no-kami (出羽守) ||Junior 5th Rank, Lower Grade (従五位下)||60,000 koku
|-
||2||||1607–1615||Shikibu-Ōi-no-suke (式部大輔); Jijū (侍従)|| Junior 4th Rank, Lower Grade (従四位下)||26,000 koku
|-
|colspan=6| Matsudaira (Nomi) clan, 1619-1622 (fudai)
|-
||1||||1619–1621||Ōsumi-no-kami (大隈守) ||Junior 5th Rank, Lower Grade (従五位下)||26,000 koku
|-
||2||||1621–1622||Tango-no-kami (丹後守)||Junior 5th Rank, Lower Grade (従五位下)||26,000 koku
|-
|colspan=6|  Inoue clan, 1622-1645 (fudai; 52,000)
|-
||1||||1622–1629||Kazue-no-kami (主計頭)|| Junior 5th Rank, Lower Grade (従五位下)||52,500 koku
|-
||2||||1628–1645||Kawachi-no-kami (河内守)||Junior 5th Rank, Lower Grade (従五位下)||50,000 koku
|-
|colspan=6| Honda clan, 1645-1682 (fudai)
|-
||1||||1645–1681||Echizen-no-kami (越前守)||Junior 5th Rank, Lower Grade (従五位下)||40,000 koku
|-
|colspan=6| Nishio clan, 1682-1868 (fudai)
|-
||1||||1682–1713||Oki-no-kami (隠岐守) ||Junior 5th Rank, Lower Grade (従五位下)|| 25,000 koku
|-
||2|| ||1713–1760||Oki-no-kami (隠岐守); Jijū (侍従)||Junior 4th Rank, Lower Grade (従四位下)||35,000 koku
|-
||3|| ||1760–1782||Mondo-no-shō (主水正) ||Junior 4th Rank, Lower Grade (従四位下)||35,000 koku
|-
||4|| ||1782–1801||Oki-no-kami (隠岐守)||Junior 5th Rank, Lower Grade (従五位下)||35,000 koku
|-
||5|| ||1801–1829||Oki-no-kami|| Junior 5th Rank, Lower Grade (従五位下)||35,000 koku
|-
||6|| ||1829–1843||Oki-no-kami (隠岐守)||Junior 5th Rank, Lower Grade (従五位下)||35,000 koku
|-
||7||||1843–1861||Oki-no-kami (隠岐守)||Junior 5th Rank, Lower Grade (従五位下)||35,000 koku
|-
||8||||1861–1868||Oki-no-kami (隠岐守)||Viscount||35,000 koku
|-
|}

See also 
 List of Han

References

External links
 "Yokosuka" at Edo 300

Notes

Domains of Japan
1601 establishments in Japan
States and territories established in 1601
1868 disestablishments in Japan
States and territories disestablished in 1868
Tōtōmi Province
History of Shizuoka Prefecture
Nishio clan